Seán MacSwiney (19 March 1878 – 22 January 1942) was an officer in the Irish Republican Army and Sinn Féin politician.

He was born at 23 North Main Street, Cork city to John McSwiney, a tobacco manufacturer, and Mary Wilkinson. He was the brother of Terence MacSwiney and Mary MacSwiney.

In 1914, he was in Canada, where spent time in custody as a result of his activities against conscription when it was introduced during World War I.

During the Irish War of Independence, he served as an officer in Cork No 1 Brigade.

Terence, then a Sinn Féin Teachta Dála (TD) and the Lord Mayor of Cork, died on hunger strike in 1920. He was elected at the 1921 elections for the Cork Mid, North, South, South East and West constituency and became a member of the Second Dáil. His sister Mary was elected for the Cork Borough constituency at the same election.
Captured in 1921, he was sentenced to death, later commuted to 15 years' penal servitude. A few months into his sentence, in April 1921, he escaped from Spike Island.

He opposed the Anglo-Irish Treaty and voted against it (as did his sister Mary). During the Irish Civil War, he was quartermaster for the 1st Southern Division of the anti-Treaty IRA and served on the IRA executive. He evaded capture until after the IRA called a ceasefire, and in November 1923 he was arrested in Kerry and interned.

He was defeated at the 1922 general election. In 1933, standing on a Republican ticket, he was elected to Cork Corporation.
In 1936 MacSwiney and Tomás Mac Curtain's son Tomas Og were imprisoned in Arbour Hill.

He died, aged 63, at Glenvera private hospital, Cork.

See also
Families in the Oireachtas

References

1878 births
1942 deaths
Early Sinn Féin TDs
Irish Republican Army (1919–1922) members
Irish Republican Army (1922–1969) members
Members of the 2nd Dáil
People of the Irish Civil War (Anti-Treaty side)
Politicians from County Cork
Sean